Dexter Township is a township in Cowley County, Kansas, USA.  As of the 2000 census, its population was 506.

Geography

The streams of Bullington Creek, Deer Creek, Little Crabb Creek and Turkey Creek run through this township.

References
 USGS Geographic Names Information System (GNIS)

External links
 City-Data.com

Townships in Cowley County, Kansas
Townships in Kansas